Carenum parvulum is a species of ground beetle in the subfamily Scaritinae, found in Australia. It was described by William John Macleay in 1873.

References

parvulum
Beetles described in 1873